In numerical analysis, the Dormand–Prince (RKDP) method or DOPRI method, is an embedded method for solving ordinary differential equations . The method is a member of the Runge–Kutta family of ODE solvers. More specifically, it uses six function evaluations to calculate fourth- and fifth-order accurate solutions. The difference between these solutions is then taken to be the error of the (fourth-order) solution. This error estimate is very convenient for adaptive stepsize integration algorithms. Other similar integration methods are Fehlberg (RKF) and Cash–Karp (RKCK).

The Dormand–Prince method has seven stages, but it uses only six function evaluations per step because it has the FSAL (First Same As Last) property: the last stage is evaluated at the same point as the first stage of the next step. Dormand and Prince chose the coefficients of their method to minimize the error of the fifth-order solution. This is the main difference with the Fehlberg method, which was constructed so that the fourth-order solution has a small error. For this reason, the Dormand–Prince method is more suitable when the higher-order solution is used to continue the integration, a practice known as local extrapolation.

Dormand–Prince is currently the default method in the ode45 solver for MATLAB and GNU Octave and is the default choice for the Simulink's model explorer solver.  
It is an option in Python's SciPy ODE integration library  and in Julia (programming language)'s ODE solvers library.  
Fortran, 
Java, and 
C++
implementations are also available.

The Butcher tableau is:

The first row of b coefficients gives the fifth-order accurate solution, and the second row gives the fourth-order accurate solution.

Notes

References 
 Software implementation in MATLAB: https://www.mathworks.com/help/matlab/ref/ode45.html
 Implementation in GNU Octave: https://octave.org/doc/interpreter/Matlab_002dcompatible-solvers.html#Matlab_002dcompatible-solvers
 Implementation in Python (programming language) : https://web.archive.org/web/20150907215914/http://adorio-research.org/wordpress/?p=6565
 .
 .
 .
 .

Further reading
 Engstler, C., & Lubich, C. (1997). MUR8: a multirate extension of the eighth-order Dormand–Prince method. Applied numerical mathematics, 25(2-3), 185-192.
 Calvo, M., Montijano, J. I., & Randez, L. (1990). A fifth-order interpolant for the Dormand and Prince Runge-Kutta method. Journal of Computational and Applied Mathematics, 29(1), 91-100.
 Aristoff, J. M., Horwood, J. T., & Poore, A. B. (2014). Orbit and uncertainty propagation: a comparison of Gauss–Legendre-, Dormand–Prince-, and Chebyshev–Picard-based approaches. Celestial Mechanics and Dynamical Astronomy, 118(1), 13-28.
 Seen, W. M., Gobithaasan, R. U., & Miura, K. T. (2014, July). GPU acceleration of Runge Kutta-Fehlberg and its comparison with Dormand–Prince method. In AIP Conference Proceedings (Vol. 1605, No. 1, pp. 16–21). AIP.

Numerical analysis
Numerical differential equations
Runge–Kutta methods